Wróblowice may refer to the following places in Poland:
Wróblowice, Lower Silesian Voivodeship (south-west Poland)
Wróblowice, Lesser Poland Voivodeship (south Poland)
Wróblowice, part of the Swoszowice district of Kraków